Aramabaduge Kalana Miththa Jinadasa is a Sri Lankan naval officer and former Commandant of the Navy's Naval and Maritime Academy. He was the first Flag Officer Sea Training (FOST), former Director Naval Operations, Director Foreign Corporations, Director Maritime Special Forces, Director Maritime Surveillance, Director Naval Inspectorate and Deputy Director Naval Operations.

Educated at the Royal College Colombo, from 1975 to 1987 he joined the Sri Lankan Navy as an Officer Cadet in 1987. Having been commissioned as a Sub-Lieutenant, after successfully completing the International Midshipmen course at prestigious Britannia Royal Naval College by winning the Best International Midshipman award and he served in many capacities including Senior Staff Officer Operations at Naval Headquarters and at the Northern Naval Command. He graduated from the U.S. Naval War College.

References

Sri Lankan commodores
Alumni of Royal College, Colombo
Naval and Maritime Academy graduates
Naval War College alumni
Living people
Year of birth missing (living people)